Spade Cooley's Western Swing Song Folio was the first songbook to identify the big Western dance band music as Western Swing. In October 1944, "Billboard made the following announcement, unceremoniously giving the subgenre its common label for the first time in a national publication: 'Spade Cooley will put out 25 of his original tunes, together with an album of band numbers and suggestions on arrangements for Western Bands. Book to be titled 'Western Swing'." All songs in the folio list both Spade Cooley and Smokey Rogers as co-writers.

Spade Cooley was one of the first song-writers signed by Jean and Julian Aberbach for their new music publishing house, Hill and Range Songs, Inc., the publishers of this folio.

Sheet music 
Sheet music in the folio are:
 "Oklahoma Gal"
 "Jive on the Range"
 "There is No Sunshine"
"Heavenly Range"
"Gitar Swing"
"You're Gonna Pay"
"Now and Always"
"My Chickashay Gal"
"Do Ya or Don'tcha"
"Shawnee Blues"
"Tennessee Wagner"
"You Gotta Quit Your Triflin'"
"I'm Waiting for the Day (That You Come Back)"
"Gonna Leave You Blues"
"You're Breakin' This Poor Heart of Mine"

References

Bibliography 
 Cooley, Donnell C. "Spade". Spade Cooley's Western Swing Song Folio. Beverly Hills, Calif: Hill and Range Songs (1945).
 Lange, Jeffrey J.Smile When You Call Me a Hillbilly: Country Music's Struggle for Respectability, 1939-1954. Athens, GA: University of Georgia Press (2004).

Song books
1945 books
1945 in American music
Western swing